Consumer Duty is a standard introduced by the Financial Conduct Authority, in the UK, intended to improve Consumer protection for financial-services firms in the UK

Requirements
The new rule establishes a "Consumer Principle"; firms must "act to deliver good outcomes for retail customers". Affected firms should review their products and their customer journeys. This also requires effective anti-fraud controls..

There have been concerns that these requirements place an undue burden on smaller firms.

Components of Customer Duty
 The "Consumer Principle", which becomes the 12th Principle of the FCA's "Principles for Businesses"
 The cross-cutting rules
 The four outcomes:
 the governance of products and services
 price and value
 consumer understanding, and
 consumer support

Timeline
 The Consumer Duty standard evolved from Following FCA consultations in 2021;
 The final version of the guidance was published in July 2022;
 Implementation plans should have been agreed by firms' leadership 31 October 2022;
 Firms must implement the rule for their current business by July 2023;
 Consumer Duty is applied to "closed books" by July 2024;
 First annual board attestation by 31 July 2024.

See also
 Consumer Financial Protection Bureau
 FCA Controlled Functions
 Financial Policy Committee
 Financial Services Authority
 Fraud Advisory Panel
 Prudential Regulation Authority
 Senior Managers Regime
Consumer protection in the United Kingdom

References

External links

Consumer protection in the United Kingdom